This is a list of fellows of the Royal Society elected in 1697.

Fellows 
George Stepney  (1663–1707)
John Hutton  (d. 1712) Scottish physician and MP
Jacques Basnage de Beauval  (1653–1722)
Ralph Thoresby  (1658–1725)
Abraham de Moivre  (1667–1754)

References

1697
1697 in science
1697 in England